Yerra Srilakshmi is an officer of the  Indian Administrative Service (IAS). Srilakshmi was former Andhra Pradesh Secretary for Industries (including).Telangana government gave her the posting order on October 7, 2016, appointing as Chief Secretary of State Government Institutions, despite previous allegations and pending investigations for various involvement in controversial decisions, on approval by AP govt. She got the Special Chief Secretary post. In Dec'2020 she shifted from Telangana cadre to Andhra Pradesh cadre, albeit with questions asked about her previous involvement in various corruption issues and even being jailed for the same, being only let out on grounds of 'ill health'. She was posted as Secretary Municipal administration and urban development.

Cases which are under court trials
The Central Bureau of Investigation (CBI) arrested V.D. Rajagopal and Y. Srilakshmi, as third and fourth accused respectively in the investigation into illegal mining by Obulapuram Mining Company. The permission for mining in Anantapur was for captive mining, i.e. the ore mined in that region is to be used in the local steel plant and not to be exported. Srilakshmi is accused of dropping the term "captive mining" in the final order approving a mining license to Obulapuram. Srilakshmi suggested that this was done at the insistence of the former Minister of Mines and current Telangana minister Sabitha Indra Reddy. However the CBI defended the Home minister, who is a senior local politician of the ruling Congress party. She was suspended from the IAS after 48 hours of police custody. She received conditional bail on 2 December 2011. The Andhra Pradesh High Court cancelled bail on 2 Jan 2012 and Srilakshmi was taken into judicial custody. Srilakshmi was again granted interim bail on 9 October 2012 till 20 January 2013 with Rs. 50,000 bond.

CBI Charge sheet in OMC case
The CBI alleged that Srilakshmi and Rajagopal demanded huge bribes from mine owners for prospecting licences. The CBI said in the charge sheet that Srilakshmi showed preferential treatment to Obulapuram Mining Company even with respect to the state owned Mineral Development Corporation (APMDC) for mining leases. On Srilakshmi, the charge sheet said that the senior IAS officer, as secretary of industries and commerce, also deliberately favoured the OMC in allotting mining area. The department had received more than 30 applications for lease of the six mining areas in the state and Srilakshmi deliberately allocated three areas to OMC. Among those rejected by her were Ch Shasi Kumar (11 May 2005) and Gimpex Limited (26 April 2007). Favouring OMC, Srilakshmi wrote a letter to the ministry of mines that OMC was a bonafide firm.

Conflict between AP state government ministers and IAS officers
The conflict between the ministers of the state of Andhra Pradesh, who are elected politicians and the officers from the IAS cadre came to public view in Feb 2012. The extent of corruption in the YSR government was even highlighted in the US state department cables exposed by Wikileaks. In the inter-related investigations into the OMC mining scandal, the EMAAR-MGF Boulder Hills scam and the inquiry into the inordinate wealth of Y. S. Jagan Mohan Reddy allegedly accumulated as a quid-pro-quo for favours received from the Y.S. Rajasekhara Reddy government, the CBI has focused on various IAS officers. IAS officers from Andhra Pradesh including Srilakshmi, Rajagopal, B. P. Acharya, L. V. Subrahmanyam, K. V. Rao, K. Ratna Prabha, etc., have been arrested, charge-sheeted or have been questioned by the CBI in the investigation. 

The AP IAS Officers Association alleged that they were made scapegoats for the decisions forced by the supervising ministers. They suggested that the decisions that incriminated the IAS officers took, could not have been implemented without the approval of concerned members of the Council of Ministers. The officers have challenged the CBI procedures in these arrests. While Opposition political parties have suggested that the IAS officers name the ministers responsible for corruption in Andhra Pradesh, the Congress party functionaries have denied that the officers are being made scapegoats. Several other voices including the former vigilance commissioner, Ramachandra Samal, have reiterated that the system is deep in corruption.

References

Living people
Illegal mining in India
Corruption in Andhra Pradesh
Indian Administrative Service officers
Year of birth missing (living people)